The  is a handheld game console developed by Bandai and released in Japan on 1984 and later in Europe in 1986 during the Second generation of video game consoles.
Only 8 games are known to exist for the system.

Games 
Each console came with 2 pack in games. In Japan there were two retail configurations, A and B. Europe had several retail configurations and four games released.

A

B

European Release
Pelican
Penguin
Submarine
Frog & Insects

Hardware
Each game cartridge included an LCD.

The system used one to two LR44 button cell batteries depending on the model.

References 

Products introduced in 1984
Second-generation video game consoles
Handheld game consoles
Bandai consoles